Rhyphelia is a monotypic genus of South American jumping spiders containing the single species, Rhyphelia variegata. It was first described by Eugène Louis Simon in 1902, and is found only in Brazil and Venezuela.

References

Monotypic Salticidae genera
Salticidae
Spiders of South America